Richard Pakleppa (born 1961) is a white Namibian screenwriter, film director and film producer.

Pakleppa studied philosophy and theatre in Munich, Germany and gained a Honours Degree in African studies from the University of Cape Town. Since 1990, he has directed and produced documentary and fiction films across Southern Africa. He currently lives in South Africa.

Filmography
 The Strongest Heart, 2005
 Angola: Saudades from the One Who Loves You, 2006
 Taste of Rain, 2012
 Jogo de Corpo. Capaeira e Ancestralidade, 2013
 Paths to Freedom, 2014
 Dying for Gold, 2018 (co-directed by Catherine Meyburgh)

Writing
 '40,000 workers stayaway in Namibia', South Africa Labour Bulletin, Vol. 13, No. 6, 1988, pp.15-23

References

External links
 

1961 births
Living people
Namibian film directors
University of Cape Town alumni